Ryusuke Sakai (酒井 隆介, born September 7, 1988) is a Japanese football player, who features for FC Machida Zelvia.

Career

Club
On 24 December 2018, Sakai moved permanently to Machida Zelvia following a loan deal the previous season.

Club statistics
Updated to end of 2018 season.

References

External links
Profile at Machida Zelvia
Profile at Nagoya Grampus

1988 births
Living people
Komazawa University alumni
Association football people from Shiga Prefecture
Japanese footballers
J1 League players
J2 League players
Kyoto Sanga FC players
Matsumoto Yamaga FC players
Nagoya Grampus players
FC Machida Zelvia players
Association football defenders